Gisèle Ndaya Luseba is a politician and businessperson in the Democratic Republic of the Congo. She is head of the political party Convention of Unified Labor Democrats (CDTU), and vice-president of Dynafec.  
 On 12 April 2021 she replaced Béatrice Lomeya as Minister for Gender, Family and Children in the Lukonde cabinet.

Life
Gisèle Ndaya Luseba graduated in marketing from ISC Kinshasa, and has another degree in theology. She has a masters in marketing economics, and is a specialist in political party management at UN Academia. In 2020 her PhD thesis was announced, "The role of women in political institutions in the Democratic Republic of Congo: utopia or reality?". She is married to a prominent magistrate.

Ndaya was appointed Minister for Gender, Family and Children in April 2021. In June 2021 a pan-African Conference on Gender Equality was held in Kinshasa. In July 2021, after the Generation Equality Forum convened by UN Women in Paris, Ndaya and Julienne Lusenge led a delegation of African women announcing the outcome of the Kinshasa conference, a proposed ten-year goal for African women, the Kinshasa Declaration.

References

Living people
Year of birth missing (living people)
Women government ministers of the Democratic Republic of the Congo
Women's ministers
21st-century Democratic Republic of the Congo women politicians
21st-century Democratic Republic of the Congo politicians